Abert is a surname. Notable people with the surname include:

John James Abert (1788–1863), American cartographer
James William Abert (1820–1897), explorer
Johann Joseph Abert (1832–1915), composer
Hermann Abert (1871–1927), music historian

See also
ABERT, a Brazilian radio and television association
Abert Rim, a fault scarp in Oregon
Abert's squirrel
Abert's towhee